Christian Poser (born 16 August 1986) is a German bobsledder who has competed since 2008. His best World Cup finish was first in the four-man event at Calgary in December 2010.

Poser became engaged to American bobsledder Jamie Greubel in April 2013. The couple married in the summer of 2014.

References

External links 
 
 
 

1986 births
Living people
German male bobsledders
Olympic bobsledders of Germany
Bobsledders at the 2014 Winter Olympics
Bobsledders at the 2018 Winter Olympics